, better known by the pen name , was a Japanese manga artist born in Tokyo, Japan. His pseudonym came about due to a publisher's error when printing his name, and he continued using the pseudonym after that.

His oldest son is classical guitarist Shiki Nagashima.

History
From the time he was in junior high school, Nagashima aspired to become a manga artist. After dropping out of school during junior high, he worked as a paperboy and a tofu salesman. He made his professional debut as a manga artist in 1952 with his story .

After becoming acquainted with Osamu Tezuka due to occasionally living at Tokiwa-sō, he became Tezuka's assistant. While there, he formed the group Musashi Production with artists including Atsushi Sugimura (who was working under the pseudonym Kontarō), Kyūta Ishikawa and Kuni Fukai (who was working under the pseudonym Hirō Fukai).

He soon became friends with several members of the Gekiga Kōbō, including Yoshihiro Tatsumi and Takao Saito, while living in a provincial temple. After the breakup of Gekiga Kōbō, Nagashima began working for Saitō Production and his work began to reflect a more cinematic and dramatic feel. During this time, he began a somewhat wandering lifestyle living in Shinjuku.

In 1961, Nagashima published , a story which showed the "other side" of the manga industry and which brought Nagashima to the forefront of that industry.

He continued publishing new works in a variety of magazines such as COM and Garo, and due to his unusual style began to be called the "father of seinen manga". From 1964 to 1966, he worked at Mushi Production working on anime television series such as Jungle Taitei, and later again worked for Mushi as a character designer on Wansa-kun (1973).

Nagashima won the Shogakukan Manga Award for his  in 1972.

Beginning in the 1980s, he began releasing fewer series, and went into semi-retirement. He was diagnosed with diabetes, which subsequently caused him to begin having dialysis treatments in 2000. Nagashima died of heart failure on June 10, 2005 at a Tokyo hospital.

Works
 (1956, Shōjo)
 (1961–1964, Keiji)
 (1962, Akahata)
 (1964, Atom Club)
 (1967, Shōnen King)
 (1967–1970, COM, Garo, Play Comic)
 (1967, written by Ikki Kajiwara, Shōnen King, was later adapted into a drama starring Ken'ichi Sakuragi)
 (1968–1969, Wakamono)
 (1970)
 (1971, Perfect Liberty)
 (1971–1973, high school course books)
 (1971, Weekly Shōnen Sunday)
 (1972, Shinfujin)
 (1972, Shōnen King)
 (1972–1973)
 (1973–1974)
 (1996, based on the novel by Kenji Miyazawa, NHK Publishing)
 (2006, Chikuma Shūpansha)

Essays
 (1981, Daiwa Shobō)
 (1983, Kizukisha Bijutsu Shuppan)
 (1984, Obunsha)

References

External links

1937 births
2005 deaths
Manga artists from Tokyo